Young Canadian Mothers is an EP by the Canadian musician Owen Pallett, released in 2006 under the name Final Fantasy. It was limited to 500 copies.

Track listing
"This Is the Dream of Emma & Cam" – 3:11
"The Sea (Tenderizer)" – 3:07
"Spell for a Weak Heart" – 3:00
"Peach, Plum, Pear" (Joanna Newsom cover) – 2:45

Personnel
Recorded and mixed at MSTRKFT and Go Get
By Leon, Owen and Al
Drum programming on "Spell For a Weak Heart" created by ZZT-OOP
Backing vocals on '"The Sea" by Amy L
Illustration by Nicholas Sung
Design by Patrick

References

Owen Pallett albums
2006 debut EPs